"Everybody Loves a Happy Ending" / "Call Me Mellow" are songs by the British band Tears for Fears, released as a double A-side single from their album Everybody Loves a Happy Ending.

The single peaked at #45 on the Italian Singles Chart

Track listing

Promotional CD5 : Gut/PRCDGUT70 

 "Call Me Mellow" (Simon Thornton Radio Edit) – 3:11
 "Call Me Mellow" (Steve Fitzmaurice Radio Edit) – 2:36
 "Call Me Mellow" (Dead Stereo Radio Edit) – 3:34
 "Everybody Loves a Happy Ending" (Steve Fitzmaurice Mix) – 2:34

Promotional CD5 : Gut/PRCDGUT70Y 

 "Call Me Mellow" (MaUVe Club Mix) – 7:00
 "Call Me Mellow" (Tin Tin Out Coney Island Dub) – 7:19
 "Call Me Mellow" (Tin Tin Out Coney Island Club Mix) – 7:48
 "Call Me Mellow" (MaUVe Dub) – 6:48

Commercial CD5 : Gut/CDGUT70 

 "Everybody Loves a Happy Ending" (Steve Fitzmaurice Mix) – 2:33
 "Call Me Mellow" (Album Version) – 3:37
 "Call Me Mellow" (Tin Tin Out Coney Island Club Mix) – 7:48

Commercial 12" : Gut/12GUT70 

 "Call Me Mellow" (Tin Tin Out Coney Island Club Mix) – 7:48
 "Everybody Loves a Happy Ending" (Steve Fitzmaurice Mix) – 2:33
 "Call Me Mellow" (Mauve Club Mix) – 6:58

References

2004 songs
2005 singles
Tears for Fears songs
Songs written by Roland Orzabal
Songs written by Curt Smith